Puerto Rican singer and songwriter Olga Tañón has released fourteen studio albums, one EP album, three live albums and six greatest hits albums. She's known as "La Mujer de Fuego" (the woman of fire) for her electrifying stage performances and has received two Guinness World Records for being the tropical female artist with the most top 10 singles and the most awarded artist in the history of the Premio Lo Nuestro awards.

Tañón came to prominence following the release of her debut studio album Sola (1992), her follow-up studio albums throughout the 1990s and 2000s led her to be one of the top selling female artist in the Tropical genre with estimated worldwide sales of 2 million albums. With multiple #1 albums and singles on the Billboard Latin charts, in addition to numerous top 10 hit singles, her contributions to the music industry have garnered her numerous achievements including two Grammy Awards, four Latin Grammy Awards, five Billboard Latin Music Awards and thirty Premio Lo Nuestro Awards.

Albums

Studio

EP

Live

Greatest Hits

Singles

Lead Artist

Featured Artist

Awards

Grammy Awards

Latin Grammy Awards

References

Discographies of Puerto Rican artists
Latin pop music discographies
Tropical music discographies